Paige Cooper is a Canadian writer, originally from Canmore, Alberta and currently based in Montreal, Quebec. Her debut short story collection Zolitude was named as a longlisted nominee for the 2018 Scotiabank Giller Prize, a shortlisted finalist for the Governor General's Award for English-language fiction and a runner-up for the Danuta Gleed Literary Award. A French translation of Zolitude was published by Éditions du Boréal in 2019.

The collection derives its title from Zolitūde, an apartment block in Riga, Latvia where a major shopping centre underwent a roof collapse in 2013. The book's stories have been described as speculative fiction.

Her short stories have also appeared in The Fiddlehead, West Branch, Michigan Quarterly Review, Gulf Coast Online, Canadian Notes & Queries, The New Quarterly and the Journey Prize anthology.

Bibliography
Zolitude (2018)

References

Living people
21st-century Canadian short story writers
21st-century Canadian women writers
Anglophone Quebec people
Canadian women short story writers
Canadian speculative fiction writers
Writers from Montreal
Year of birth missing (living people)